Frenchtown is an unincorporated community in Spencer Township, Harrison County, Indiana.

History
Frenchtown was first settled in 1840 by a colony of French immigrants. A post office was established at Frenchtown in 1873, and remained in operation until it was discontinued in 1905.

Geography

References

Unincorporated communities in Harrison County, Indiana
Unincorporated communities in Indiana
Louisville metropolitan area
Populated places established in 1840
1840 establishments in Indiana